Lloyd, Lloyd's, or Lloyds may refer to:

People
 List of people with given name Lloyd
 List of people with surname Lloyd
 Lloyd (singer) (born 1986), American singer

Places

United States
 Lloyd, Florida
 Lloyd, Kentucky
 Lloyd, Montana
 Lloyd, New York
 Lloyd, Ohio
 Lloyds, Alabama
 Lloyds, Maryland
 Lloyds, Virginia

Elsewhere
 Lloydminster, or "Lloyd", straddling the provincial border between Alberta and Saskatchewan, Canada

Companies and businesses

Derived from Lloyd's Coffee House 
Lloyd's Coffee House, a London meeting place for merchants and shipowners between about 1688 and 1774
 Lloyd's of London, a British insurance market
 Lloyd's of London (film), a 1936 film about the insurance market
 Lloyd's building, its headquarters
 Lloyd's Agency Network
 Lloyd's List, a website and 275-year-old daily newspaper on shipping and global trade
 Lloyd's List Intelligence (formerly Lloyd's MIU), a maritime information database
 Lloyd's Register, a ship classification and risk management organization
 , a classification society based in Germany
 , a former German shipping line, and several successor companies
 Hapag-Lloyd shipping line
 , Hapag-Lloyd Express, Hapag-Lloyd Airlines, former German airline companies
 , a shipping line of the Austro-Hungarian Empire; a shipping management company of this name still exists
 , subsequently renamed , Italian shipping line evolved from Austrian Lloyd
 Austrian Lloyd Ship Management, a Cypriot company founded in the 20th century
 Nedlloyd, a Netherlands shipping line, later merged into P&O Nedlloyd and now part of Maersk Line
  (LAB Airlines) of Bolivia

Other companies 
 Lloyds Banking Group, a large banking group in the United Kingdom
 Lloyds Pharmacy, the largest community pharmacy operator in the United Kingdom
 Lloyd Cars Ltd, a former British automobile brand
 Lloyd's Weekly Newspaper, an early Sunday newspaper in the United Kingdom
 Stewarts & Lloyds, a former British steel tube manufacturer
 Lloyd Hotel, Amsterdam, The Netherlands
 Lloyd Motoren Werke GmbH a German car company active between 1908 and 1963
 Lloyd's Barbecue, an American brand of barbecue products sold by Hormel
 Delta Lloyd insurance in the low countries
 Hungarian Lloyd Aircraft and Engine Factory

Fictional characters
 Lloyd the bartender, in the Stanley Kubrick film The Shining
 Lloyd Asplund, from the anime series Code Geass
 Lloyd Bloch, in the Marvel Comics universe
 Lloyd Braun (Seinfeld), in the NBC sitcom, Seinfeld
 Llwyd ap Cil Coed, in the story Mabinogion
 Lloyd Christmas, played by Jim Carrey in the film Dumb and Dumber
 Lloyd Dobler, in the 1989 Cameron Crowe film, Say Anything..., played by John Cusack
 Lloyd Garmadon, the main character in the animated TV series Ninjago
 Lloyd Henreid, in Stephen King's The Stand
 Lloyd Irving, in the video game Tales of Symphonia
 Lloyd Lee, Ari Gold's assistant in the HBO television series, Entourage
 Lloyd Nebulon, the main character in the Disney animated series Lloyd in Space
 Lloyd Reed, a antagonist from the tactical video game Fire Emblem: The Blazing Blade
 Lloyd Tavernier, in the BBC soap opera EastEnders
 Lloyd Waterman, in the American sitcom The Cleveland Show
 Lloyd the Delivery Guy, a minor character from Scrubs
 Lloyd, in the video game Mother, also known as EarthBound Beginnings

Other uses 
 Lloyd (film), a 2001 comedy written and directed by Hector Baron
 Lloyd rifle, a magazine-fed sporting rifle
 Lloyd's mirror, an optical and an acoustic experiment
 Lloyds, a barque hired by the New Zealand Company to bring settlers to Nelson

See also
 Floyd (disambiguation)
 Loyd (disambiguation)